The Cat and the Fiddle may refer to:

"Hey Diddle Diddle" or "The Cat and the Fiddle", a nursery rhyme
The Cat and the Fiddle (musical), a 1931 Broadway production by Jerome Kern and Otto Harbach
The Cat and the Fiddle (film), a 1934 adaptation the stage musical
The Cat and the Fiddle (album), a 1977 album by Papa John Creach
"The Cat and the Fiddle" (Batman), a 1966 television episode
The Cat and the Fiddle (play), a 1971 play by John McDonnell

See also
Cat and Fiddle Inn, Cheshire, England
Cat and Fiddle Road, England, named after the inn
Cats and the Fiddle, an African American singing group